Ali Ibrahim Ali Abdulla Al-Hammadi (born 27 January 1988) is an Emirati former professional footballer who played as a midfielder for Al Dhafra.

External links

References

Living people
1988 births
Sportspeople from Dubai
Emirati footballers
Association football midfielders
Al Dhafra FC players
UAE First Division League players
UAE Pro League players